Serbia women's national softball team is the national softball team of Serbia and is controlled by Serbian softball federation. The team represents Serbia in international competitions.

World Championship
2016 - Qualified

European Championship
1979-2005 - Did not participate
2007 - 12th (in B division)
2009-2013 - Did not participate

European U22 Championship
2008-2014 - Did not participate

European Junior Championship
1991 - 2008 - Did not participate
2010 - 14th
2012 - Did not participate
2014 - 11th

European Cadet Championship
2009-2009 - Did not participate
2011 - 10th place
2013 - 10th place
2015 - Did not participate

European Championship Minime Girls
2002-2008 - Did not participate
2010 - 2nd

External links
Serbian softball federation
 International Softball Federation

Softball
Women's national softball teams
Softball in Serbia